The 2013 WAFU Nations Cup (known as the Go!TV WAFU Cup for sponsorship reasons) is an international home-based football competition. It was hosted in Ghana. The competition was organised by the West African Football Union (WAFU). It was originally scheduled to take place between October 24 and November 3, however it was delayed and began on 21 November.

All games were played in Ashanti. The venues were the Baba Yara Stadium and the Len Clay Stadium. Ghana won the title after beating Senegal 3–1 in the final.

Participants

Group stage

Group A

Group B

Knockout stage

Third place playoff

Final

Goalscorers
Saibou Badarou won the top-scorer award. He scored 3 goals.

3 goals

 Saibou Badarou
 Abdel Fadel Suanon
 Talla N'Diaye

2 goals

 Sapol Mani
 Kwabena Adusei
 Latif Mohammed
 Oumarou Alio Youssouf

1 goal

 Iréké Agonhoussou
 Cédric Coréa
 Jodel Dossou
 Francis Kaboré
 Mohamed Kaboré
 Oumarou Nébié
 Bassirou Ouédraogo
 Michael Akuffu
 Theophilus Annorbaah
 Sulley Mohammed
 Yahaya Mohammed
 Godfred Saka
 Mohammed Varney
 Roger Gomis
 Soro M'Baye
 Dominique Mendy
 Richard Sagna
 Sidy Sarr
 Kwame Quee
 Kondo Arimiyaou
 Gazozo Kokouvi
 Martin Kossivi Nouwoklo

References

WAFU Nations Cup
2013 in African football
2013
2013–14 in Ghanaian football